Colleen Sullivan-Leonard (born 1959) is an American politician from Alaska. A Republican, she represented District 7 in the Alaska House of Representatives.

Political career
Sullivan-Leonard served on the Wasilla City Council from 2001 to 2003 and again from 2010 to 2016.

In 2016, Sullivan-Leonard successfully ran for the Alaska House of Representatives, succeeding Lynn Gattis. She defeated Brandon Montano in the 2016 Republican primary and Democrat Sherie Olson in the general election. In 2020, facing a contested primary, she declined to run for a third term.

References

1959 births
Alaska city council members
Living people
Republican Party members of the Alaska House of Representatives
People from Wasilla, Alaska
Women state legislators in Alaska
Women city councillors in Alaska
21st-century American politicians
21st-century American women politicians